Brian Goodwin (born 10 October 1949) is a Scottish former footballer who played for Chelsea, Hamilton Academical, Dumbarton and Stranraer.

References

1949 births
Scottish footballers
Chelsea F.C. players
Hamilton Academical F.C. players
Dumbarton F.C. players
Stranraer F.C. players
Scottish Football League players
Living people
Association football forwards